Darwin's wall gecko (Tarentola darwini) is a species of lizard in the family Phyllodactylidae. The species is endemic to Cape Verde, where it occurs on the islands of São Nicolau, Sal, Santiago, and Fogo.

Taxonomy and etymology
T. darwini was described and named by German herpetologist Ulrich Joger in 1984. The specific name darwini refers to English naturalist Charles Darwin, who visited the island of Santiago in 1832.

Habitat
The preferred natural habitat of T. darwini is arid, rocky areas at low altitudes.

Description

Reproduction
T. darwini is oviparous.

References

Further reading
Joger U (1984). "Die Radiation der Gattung Tarentola in Makaronesien ". Courier Forschungsinstitut Senckenberg 71: 91-111. (Tarentola darwini, new species, p. 96). 
Rösler H (1995). Geckos der Welt: Alle Gattungen. Leipzig: Urania Verlag. 256 pp. . (Tarentola darwini, p. 157). (in German).
Vasconcelos R, Perera A, Geniez P, Harris DJ, Carranza S (2012). "An integrative taxonomic revision of the Tarentola geckos (Squamata, Phyllodactylidae) of the Cape Verde Islands". Zoological Journal of the Linnean Society 164 (2): 328–360. (Tarentola darwini, p. 346).

caboverdiana
Geckos of Africa
Endemic vertebrates of Cape Verde
Reptiles described in 1984
Fauna of São Nicolau, Cape Verde
Fauna of Sal, Cape Verde
Fauna of Santiago, Cape Verde
Fauna of Fogo, Cape Verde
Taxa named by Hans Hermann Schleich